Free is the second album by alternative rock band Concrete Blonde. It marked the addition of bass player Alan Bloch.

Free peaked at number 90 on the Australian ARIA Charts.

Critical reception 

Chris Murray, reviewer of RPM, considered that "this album has something to please everybody" and it "sounding better with each listen." In the end he expressed a hope that this LP "will eventually get the proper recognition."
Tom Demalton of AllMusic gave a mostly positive review of Free, proclaiming it a "worthwhile follow-up" showing "considerable amount of growth in both the songwriting and playing" since the debut album.

Track listing
All songs written by Johnette Napolitano, except where noted.

Personnel
Produced by Concrete Blonde
Recorded by E.J. Mankey II
Megamix by Chris Tsangarides
Cover design by Johnette Napolitano & Anne Sperling
Paintings and photographs by Anne Sperling
All songs by Concrete Blonde except "It's Only Money" by Phil Lynott
Write to Concrete Blonde c/o Happy Hermit, 6520 Selma Ave, #567, L.A., CALIF 90028
Band members: Harry Rushakoff, James Mankey, Johnette Napolitano, Alan Bloch

Charts

References

Concrete Blonde albums
1989 albums
I.R.S. Records albums